The Western Kentucky Hilltoppers football statistical leaders are individual statistical leaders of the Western Kentucky Hilltoppers football program in various categories, including passing, rushing, receiving, total offense, defensive stats, and kicking. Within those areas, the lists identify single-game, single-season, and career leaders. The Hilltoppers represent Western Kentucky University (WKU) in the NCAA's Conference USA (C-USA).

Although Western Kentucky began competing in intercollegiate football in 1908, the school's official record book considers the "modern era" to have begun the 1950s. Records from before this decade are often incomplete and inconsistent, and they are generally not included in these lists.

These lists are dominated by more recent players for several reasons:
 Since 1951, seasons have increased from 10 games to 11 and then 12 games in length.
 C-USA has held a championship game since 2005. Since joining the league in 2014, WKU has appeared in three title games, winning in 2015 and 2016 and losing in 2021.
 The NCAA didn't allow freshmen to play varsity football until 1972 (with the exception of the World War II years), allowing players to have four-year careers.
 Postseason games only began counting toward single-season and career statistics in 2002. Since then, the Hilltoppers have appeared the FCS Playoffs three times and in eight bowl games.
 Due to COVID-19, the NCAA declared that the 2020 season would not count against any player's athletic eligibility, thus giving anyone who appeared in a game during that season five years of eligibility instead of the standard four.

These lists are updated through the 2021 season.

Passing

Passing yards

Passing touchdowns

Rushing

Rushing yards

Rushing touchdowns

Receiving

Receptions

Receiving yards

Receiving touchdowns

Total offense
Total offense is the sum of passing and rushing statistics. It does not include receiving or returns.

Total offense yards

Touchdowns responsible for
"Touchdowns responsible for" is the NCAA's official term for combined passing and rushing touchdowns. Note that Western's most recent (2021) football media guide does not list leaders in this statistic over any time frame, though past media guides have done so.

Defense

Interceptions

Tackles

Sacks

Kicking

Field goals made

Field goal percentage
Minimum of 20 career attempts and 10 single-season attempts.

Footnotes

References

Western Kentucky